The Central District of Nowshahr County is a district (bakhsh) in Nowshahr County, Mazandaran Province, Iran. At the 2006 census, its population was 102,131, in 27,814 families.  The District has one city: Nowshahr. The District has three rural districts (dehestan): Baladeh Kojur Rural District, Kalej Rural District, and Kheyrud Kenar Rural District.

References 

Nowshahr County
Districts of Mazandaran Province